Zhengzhou Ferris Wheel is a  tall giant Ferris wheel at Century Amusement Park in Zhengzhou, Henan, China.

When it was completed in 2003, Zhengzhou Ferris Wheel was the tallest Ferris wheel in China, and the second tallest in the world, after the  London Eye. There are now four 120 m Ferris wheels in China, the other three being Changsha Ferris Wheel (completed 2004), Suzhou Ferris Wheel (completed 2009), and Tianjin Eye (completed 2008). The only Chinese Ferris wheel with a greater height is the  Star of Nanchang, which opened in 2006.

There is at least one other giant Ferris wheel in Zhengzhou, at Renmin Park.

References 

Ferris wheels in China
Buildings and structures in Zhengzhou
Tourist attractions in Zhengzhou
Amusement rides introduced in 2003
2003 establishments in China